There have been four baronetcies created for persons with the surname Bell, all in the Baronetage of the United Kingdom. One creation is extant as of 2007.

The Bell Baronetcy, of Rounton Grange in the County of York and Washington Hall in the County of Durham, was created in the Baronetage of the United Kingdom on 21 July 1885 for the ironmaster and Liberal politician Lowthian Bell. He was succeeded by his son, the second Baronet. He was Mayor of Middlesbrough for many years and also served as Lord-Lieutenant of the North Riding of Yorkshire between 1906 and 1931. His son from his first marriage, the third Baronet, was a colonel in the 4th Battalion of the Yorkshire Regiment and fought in the Second Boer War and in the First World War. He was High Sheriff of Durham in 1921. He died unmarried and was succeeded by his nephew, the fourth Baronet. He was the son of Reverend Hugh Lowthian Bell, only son from the second marriage of the second Baronet. As of 2007 the title is held by his son, the fifth Baronet, who succeeded in 1970.

Gertrude Bell was the daughter of the second Baronet from his first marriage.

The Bell Baronetcy, of Marlborough Terrace in the Parish of Govan in the County and City of Glasgow, was created in the Baronetage of the United Kingdom on 29 August 1895 for James Bell, Lord Provost of Glasgow from 1892 to 1896. The title became extinct on the death of the second Baronet in 1943.

The Bell Baronetcy, of Framewood in the Parish of Stoke Poges in the County of Buckingham, was created in the Baronetage of the United Kingdom on 18 July 1908 for Sir John Charles Bell, Lord Mayor of London from 1907 to 1908. The title became extinct on his death in 1924.

The Bell Baronetcy, of Mynthurst in the Parish of Leigh in the County of Surrey, was created in the Baronetage of the United Kingdom on 25 November 1909 for Henry Bell. The title became extinct on the death of the second Baronet in 1955.

See also Morrison-Bell baronets.

Bell baronets, of Rounton Grange and Washington Hall (1885)
Sir (Isaac) Lowthian Bell, 1st Baronet (1810–1904)
Sir (Thomas) Hugh Bell, CB, 2nd Baronet (1844–1931)
Sir Maurice Hugh Lowthian Bell, CMG, 3rd Baronet (1871–1944)
Sir Hugh Francis Bell, 4th Baronet (1923–1970)
Sir John Lowthian Bell, 5th Baronet (born 1960)

Bell baronets, of Marlborough Terrace (1895)
Sir James Bell, 1st Baronet (1850–1929)
Sir John Bell, 2nd Baronet (1876–1943)

Bell baronets, of Framewood (1908)
Sir John Charles Bell, Kt., 1st Baronet (1843–1924)

Bell baronets, of Mynthurst (1909)
Sir Henry Bell, 1st Baronet (1848–1931)
Sir Eastman Bell, MC, 2nd Baronet (1884–1955)

Notes

References
Kidd, Charles, Williamson, David (editors). Debrett's Peerage and Baronetage (1990 edition). New York: St Martin's Press, 1990,

External links
Biography of Sir James Bell, 1st Baronet, of Marlborough Terrace

Baronetcies in the Baronetage of the United Kingdom
Extinct baronetcies in the Baronetage of the United Kingdom